Tempate is a district of the Santa Cruz canton, in the Guanacaste province of Costa Rica.

Geography 
Tempate has an area of  km² and an elevation of  metres.

Villages
Administrative center of the district is the village of Tempate.

Other villages in the district are Cañafístula, Chiles, Higuerón, Huacas, Jobo, Llano, Paraíso, Portegolpe and Potrero.

Demographics 

For the 2011 census, Tempate had a population of  inhabitants.

Transportation

Road transportation 
The district is covered by the following road routes:
 National Route 155
 National Route 180
 National Route 909
 National Route 910
 National Route 911
 National Route 933

References 

Districts of Guanacaste Province
Populated places in Guanacaste Province